Caire may refer to:
 Éric Caire (born 1965), a politician from Quebec, Canada
 Louise Caire Clark (born 1949), an American actress
 Banque du Caire or "Bank of Cairo", a full service bank headquartered in Cairo, Egypt
Places
 Cairo, Caire is the French name for Cairo.
 Chefe Caire, a village in Ancuabe District in Cabo Delgado Province in northeastern Mozambique
 Faucon-du-Caire, a commune in the Alpes-de-Haute-Provence department in southeastern France
 La Motte-du-Caire, a commune in the Alpes-de-Haute-Provence département in southeastern France
 Le Caire, a commune in the Alpes-de-Haute-Provence department in southeastern France
 Ouvrage Col du Caire Gros, a lesser work (perit ouvrage) of the Maginot Line 's Alpine extension, the Alpine Line

See also
 Caires (disambiguation)